Chandima Gamage is a Sri Lankan politician and a member of the Parliament of Sri Lanka. He was elected from Anuradhapura District in 2015. He is a Member of the United National Party. He is the son of G. D. Mahindasoma.

See also
List of political families in Sri Lanka

References

Living people
Members of the 15th Parliament of Sri Lanka
Year of birth missing (living people)
Place of birth missing (living people)